Keweenaw County is a county in the western Upper Peninsula of the U.S. state of Michigan. As of the 2020 census, the county's population was 2,046, making it Michigan's least populous county. It is also the state's largest county by total area, including the waters of Lake Superior, as well as the state's northernmost county. The county seat is Eagle River.

Located at the northeastern end of the Keweenaw Peninsula, Keweenaw County is part of the Houghton, Michigan micropolitan area. Keweenaw County also contains two National Park Service units: Isle Royale National Park and Keweenaw National Historical Park.

History 

The county was set off and organized in 1861. It is believed "Keweenaw" is a corruption of an Ojibwe word that means "portage" or "place where portage is made"; compare the names of the nearby Portage Lake and Portage River which together make up the Keweenaw Waterway.

Geography
Two land masses comprise most of the land portion of the county: Isle Royale and the northeastern half of the Keweenaw Peninsula. The county also includes the waters of Lake Superior between the two, extending to the state's water borders with Ontario and Minnesota. Of all counties (or equivalents) in the United States, Keweenaw County has the highest proportion of water area to total area.

Other lakes include Lac La Belle near Bete Grise Bay, Lake Medora, Lake Fanny Hooe near Copper Harbor, Lake Bailey at the base of Mt. Baldy, and Schlatter Lake at the tip of the peninsula.

By land, one can only access mainland Keweenaw County via Houghton County.

National protected area
Isle Royale National Park
Keweenaw National Historical Park (part)

Major highways
  runs northeast–southwest through the upper center part of the mainland portion of the county. It enters the southern area of the county at Bumbletown passes Phoenix, Delaware, Mandan, Copper Harbor and terminates north of Lake Fanny Hooe.
  loops from Phoenix to the shoreline of Lake Superior, then runs northeasterly along the shoreline to the intersection with US 41 at Copper Harbor.

Adjacent counties and district
Keweenaw County is the only county in Michigan to connect to the U.S. state of Minnesota via ferry service from Grand Portage to Windigo and Rock Harbor on Isle Royale.

By land

 Houghton County, south

By water

 Thunder Bay District, Ontario, Canada, north
 Alger County, east
 Marquette County, southeast
 Ontonagon County, southwest
 Cook County, Minnesota, northwest

Demographics 
The 2010 United States Census indicates Keweenaw County had a population of 2,156. This decrease of 145 people from the 2000 United States Census represents a -6.3% change in population. In 2010 there were 1013 households and 614 families in the county. The population density was 4 people per square mile (2/km2). There were 2,467 housing units at an average density of 4 per square mile (2/km2). 98.5% of the population were White, 0.1% Black or African American, 0.1% Native American and 1.2% of two or more races. 0.7% were Hispanic or Latino (of any race). 38.8% were of Finnish, 14.0% German, 9.0% English, 6.6% French, French Canadian or Cajun and 5.7% Irish ancestry.

There were 1013 households, out of which 16.8% had children under the age of 18 living with them, 52.4% were married couples living together, 4.9% had a female householder with no husband present, and 39.4% were non-families. 34.2% of all households were made up of individuals, and 15.0% had someone living alone who was 65 years of age or older. The average household size was 2.12 and the average family size was 2.71.

The county population contained 17.9% under the age of 18, 5.2% from 18 to 24, 20.0% from 25 to 44, 36.0% from 45 to 64, and 24.1% who were 65 years of age or older. The median age was 51.6 years. The population is 51.3% male and 48.7% female.

The median income for a household in the county was $39,821, and the median income for a family was $48,563. The per capita income for the county was $21,218. About 16.6% of families and 17.8% of the population were below the poverty line, including 34.2% of those under age 18 and 4.0% of those age 65 or over.

Politics 
Keweenaw County was solidly Republican after the American Civil War, and until the Franklin Delano Roosevelt era. In 1900, 1904 and 1908 it stood as the nation most Republican county. In his last election of 1944, Roosevelt became the first Democrat to win the county since Horatio Seymour in 1868. However, from 1964 to 1996 Keweenaw voted Democratic in every election except 1972 and 1980, thus standing as one of only six counties nationwide to support both Alf Landon and Walter Mondale, who suffered the two worst electoral vote losses since 1824. Since 2000, the county has become solidly Republican again.

Government

The county government operates the jail, maintains rural roads, operates the major local courts, records deeds, mortgages, and vital records, administers public health regulations, and participates with the state in the provision of social services. The county board of commissioners controls the budget and has limited authority to make laws or ordinances. In Michigan, most local government functions—police and fire, building and zoning, tax assessment, street maintenance, etc.—are the responsibility of individual cities and townships.
The Keweenaw County Courthouse and Sheriff's Residence and Jail in Eagle River faces Lake Superior. The courthouse was built in 1866, followed by the sheriff's residence and jail in 1886, and then remodeled in 1925. In her book Buildings of Michigan, Eckert writes:
The courthouse for this sparsely populated remote county is remarkable in its formality...These include the giant Doric columns with fillets and bases, a pediment forming a projecting portico, a modillioned cornice, and pedimented side dormers.” (p. 481)

The courthouse still preserves its original appearance.

Sparsely-populated Keweenaw County was a mining center in the latter 19th century but in the 20th century turned into a resort community. Because of this trend, Keweenaw County is also the only county in Michigan to have a lower population in the year 2000 than in 1900.

Elected officials
Probate Judge:  Keith DeForge
 Prosecuting Attorney: Charles (Chuck) Miller
 Sheriff: Curt Pennala
 County Clerk/Register of Deeds: Julie Carlson
 County Treasurer: Eric Hermanson
 Mine Inspector: John Cima

(information as of January 2021)

Communities

Village
 Ahmeek

Census-designated places
Copper Harbor
Eagle Harbor
Eagle River (county seat)

Civil townships
 Allouez Township
 Eagle Harbor Township
 Grant Township
 Houghton Township
 Sherman Township

Defunct townships 

 Copper Harbor Township
 Sibley Township

Other unincorporated communities

 Allouez
 Bete Grise
 Betsy
 Bumbletown
 Central
 Copper Falls
 Delaware
 Eagle Nest
 Fulton
 Gay
 Hebards
 Lac La Belle
 Mandan
 Mohawk
 Nepco Camp Number 7
 Ojibway
 Phoenix
 Rock Harbor Lodge
 Seneca
 Snowshoe
 Traverse
 Vaughnsville
 Windigo
 Wyoming

Ghost towns
 Clifton

See also

 List of Michigan State Historic Sites in Keweenaw County, Michigan
National Register of Historic Places listings in Keweenaw County, Michigan
Copper Country

Notes

References

Further reading

External links

Keweenaw Liberty Library
Keweenaw County Profile, Sam M Cohodas Regional Economist, Tawni Hunt Ferrarini, Ph.D.
CopperCountry.com  Tourism and Events Information for Keweenaw, Houghton and Ontonagon Counties.
CopperCountryExplorer.com
Keweenaw County Chamber of Commerce
Keweenaw County government website

Hunt's Guide to the Keweenaw Peninsula
Western Upper Peninsula Planning & Development Region

 
Michigan counties
1861 establishments in Michigan
Populated places established in 1861